The Temptation of St. Anthony is an episode in the life of the Christian monk Anthony the Great.

The Temptation of St. Anthony may also refer to:

Visual arts 
Temptation of Saint Anthony in visual arts, including a list of works with the title

Other arts 
 The Temptation of Saint Anthony (novel), an 1874 novel by Gustave Flaubert
 The Temptation of Saint Anthony (film), an 1898 silent film
 The Temptation of Saint Anthony (opera), a 2003 opera by Bernice Johnson Reagon
 "The Temptation of St. Anthony", a movement of Symphony: Mathis der Maler by Paul Hindemith
"The Temptation of Saint Anthony", a 2013 song by Alkaline Trio from My Shame Is True